Bossiaea neoanglica is a species of flowering plant in the family Fabaceae and is endemic to eastern Australia. It is a prostrate to low-lying shrub with sparsely hairy foliage, egg-shaped to more or less round leaves, and yellow and red flowers.

Description

Taxonomy and naming
Bossiaea neoanglica was first formally described in 1866 by Ferdinand von Mueller in Fragmenta Phytographiae Australiae from specimens collected by Charles Moore near the Macleay River in the New England region of New South Wales.

Distribution and habitat
This bossiaea grows in open forest and woodland from Kroombit Tops National Park in south east Queensland and south along the coast and tablelands of eastern New South Wales to Fitzroy Falls.

References

neoanglica
Mirbelioids
Flora of New South Wales
Flora of Queensland
Plants described in 1866
Taxa named by Ferdinand von Mueller